The 1980s professional wrestling boom (more commonly referred to as the Golden Era and the Rock 'n' Wrestling Era) was a surge in the popularity of professional wrestling in the United States and elsewhere throughout the 1980s. The expansion of cable television and pay-per-view, coupled with the efforts of promoters such as Vince McMahon, saw professional wrestling shift from a system controlled by numerous regional companies to one dominated by two nationwide companies: McMahon's World Wrestling Federation (WWF, now WWE) and Ted Turner's World Championship Wrestling (WCW). The decade also saw a considerable decline in the power of the National Wrestling Alliance (NWA), a cartel which had until then dominated the wrestling landscape, and in the efforts to sustain belief in the kayfabe of wrestling.

History 
In the early 1980s, professional wrestling in the U.S. consisted mainly of three competing organizations: the promotions the World Wrestling Federation (WWF) in the Northeast and the American Wrestling Association (AWA) in the Midwest, and the National Wrestling Alliance (NWA), which consisted of various wrestling promotions which operated within a territorial system around the country.

National Wrestling Alliance 

Multiple NWA territories were very successful in the 1970s and continued that success in the early 1980s. TBS became a cable television superstation based on broadcasting Georgia Championship Wrestling with both Mr. Wrestling II and Tommy Rich being the top headliners in the territory. Ric Flair rose to prominence in Mid Atlantic Wrestling, while Dusty Rhodes was the fan favorite in Championship Wrestling from Florida. Mid South Wrestling had the first significant African American champion babyface Junkyard Dog. 

Meanwhile, the NWA's affiliate in Memphis, Tennessee, the Continental Wrestling Association, had Jerry Lawler, who rose to national prominence thanks to his "feud" with Andy Kaufman. After Lawler piledrove the comedian during a 1982 match in Memphis, the two got into an altercation on NBC's Late Night with David Letterman, in which Lawler slapped Kaufman on-air and Kaufman responded by shouting profanities and throwing coffee at Lawler before storming out of the studio. The act, later revealed to be staged, is largely credited with giving rise to modern-day professional wrestling.

American Wrestling Association 

At the beginning of the 1980s, the AWA had the largest television business with distribution of their weekly broadcast in Chicago, Denver, Green Bay, Las Vegas, Milwaukee, Minneapolis, Omaha, Phoenix, Salt Lake City, San Francisco and Winnipeg. The AWA expanded into the top-ten media market of the Bay Area after Roy Shire ran his last battle royale (the annual Royal Rumble continues this idea) at the Cow Palace on January 24, 1981, demonstrating that the AWA was positioned to prosper as other promotions failed.

The AWA had the talent that would ultimately lead Vincent K. McMahon's World Wrestling Federation to pre-eminence in professional wrestling. Gene Okerlund and Bobby Heenan were AWA's major on-air talent. Hulk Hogan became the top babyface after Verne Gagne retired from full-time wrestling in 1981 and Nick Bockwinkel became the AWA World Heavyweight Champion. Hogan faced Bockwinkel on April 18, 1982, and on April 24, 1983, with both matches being decided with "Dusty finishes" where Hogan pinned Bockwinkel for a three count, but was then stripped of the title. Hogan said Gagne offered him the championship on the latter occasion in exchange for his merchandise rights and money from touring with other promotions which would show that Gagne understood wrestling was becoming a bigger business in the 1980s; however, Hogan refused. Gagne's failure to keep his fortunate position is a significant factor in the history of professional wrestling.

World Class Championship Wrestling 
In 1982, Continental Productions, a subsidiary of Dallas independent station KXTX, began syndicating a one-hour show internationally from the Sportatorium in Dallas, Texas, of former NWA affiliate World Class Championship Wrestling run by Fritz Von Erich. Channel 11 had broadcast Von Erich's professional-wrestling television program as Saturday Night Wrestling for over a decade before Channel 39 began the second broadcast.

The channel 39 broadcast was innovative because it was more like professional sports with host Bill Mercer, a former broadcaster for the Dallas Cowboys and Texas Rangers, mobile cameras at ringside with multiple shotgun microphones as used by Don King to capture and enhance the sound of impacts and crowd noise for boxing pay per views, and vignettes and interviews inspired by the Rocky movies to accentuate the heel or babyface of a wrestler outside of the ring.

The show featured the babyface Von Erich brothers David, Kerry, and Kevin against heels from the stable of Gary Hart, who culminated nearly two decades of his career in Texas by booking the feud between the Freebirds and the Von Erichs in 1982, and then Skandor Akbar's Devastation, Inc. stable in 1983. The channel 39 syndicated show earned extremely high ratings - higher than Saturday Night Live and many wrestling promotions in the United States, including the American Wrestling Association (AWA) and the WWF.

The Von Erichs were the most recognizable babyfaces in professional wrestling throughout the United States in 1982 and 1983. The fall of the Von Erichs and death of nearly every wrestler associated with the promotion are attributed to abuse of drugs, primarily steroids, stimulants including cocaine, and pain-killing opiates.

The World Wrestling Federation expands 

In 1982, Vince McMahon purchased the business from his ailing father Vincent J. McMahon. On December 23, 1983, he signed AWA superstar Hulk Hogan to return to the organization in 1984. To play Hogan's nemesis, he signed talents including Jim Crockett Promotions babyface "Rowdy" Roddy Piper, turning him heel, and AWA manager Bobby "The Brain" Heenan. McMahon stated in the documentary The UnReal Story of Professional Wrestling that he did not think his father would have ever sold him the company if he knew what he was planning to do. "He probably would have said, 'Vinny, what are you doing? You're gonna wind up at the bottom of a river'," he explained.

At the end of 1983, two major developments increased competition to be the premier professional wrestling promotion. On November 24, 1983, Ric Flair defeated Harley Race for the NWA World Heavyweight Championship at the closed-circuit wrestling event Starrcade, which inaugurated Flair's golden era and was credited with showing that a major event could earn significant income across many locations. On December 23, 1983, WWF signed Hogan to return after appearing in Rocky III in 1982 and developing a babyface gimmick in the AWA.

Fortune for the WWF came at the expense of WCCW and AWA. On January 23, 1984, Hogan defeated The Iron Sheik for the WWF World Heavyweight Championship at Madison Square Garden. Shortly after the match, the WWF began promoting wrestling shows with Hogan in the main event in parts of the United States outside the Northeast, which changed a long-standing non-aggression pact between the WWF and other wrestling promotions. On February 10, David Von Erich died in Tokyo, Japan. Although there was a short-term boost culminating in Kerry Von Erich's victory over Ric Flair for the NWA World title in front of a packed Texas Stadium crowd on May 6, WCCW rapidly lost momentum as the death of Gino Hernandez and the suicide of Mike Von Erich placed a cloud over the promotion that became its legacy. The AWA signed a TV contract with ESPN, but the revenue was insignificant compared to the WWF's pay-per-view business, which was based on annual March/April events featuring Hogan in a landmark world-championship match each year from 1986 to 1991.

With competition from cable superstations broadcasting WCCW, AWA and NWA, McMahon syndicated WWF television shows outside of the promotion's traditional Northeastern territory and began a home-video distribution label called Coliseum Video. McMahon would use the additional income generated by advertising, television deals, and video sales and rentals to further his bold ambition to tour nationally. However, such a venture required huge capital investment — one that placed the WWF on the verge of financial collapse.

McMahon did not meet immediate success. In May 1984, in a failed attempt to garner a greater appeal in the Southeast, McMahon bought a controlling interest in Georgia Championship Wrestling (GCW), an NWA member which held the lucrative Saturday time slot on Atlanta-based independent station WTBS—known outside of Atlanta as "Superstation TBS." On July 14, 1984 — later dubbed "Black Saturday" — WWF programming began airing in the TBS timeslot formerly occupied by GCW programming. The WWF programming was not successful and viewed as comical compared to the NWA. Due to low ratings and viewer protests, TBS began airing wrestling by Ole Anderson's promotion, as well as Bill Watts's Mid-South Wrestling, both of which garnered higher ratings than McMahon's WWF show. Later, McMahon sold the TBS timeslot to rival promoter Jim Crockett, Jr. for $1 million. In the WWE documentary The Rise and Fall of WCW, Crockett explained that his purchase of the timeslot basically paid for McMahon's first WrestleMania.

By the end of 1984, the regional territory system of the NWA in Canada and the United States was clearly in jeopardy. In June 1984, Jack Tunney transferred his control in Maple Leaf Wrestling to the WWF. The AWA, WCCW and Memphis-based Continental Wrestling Association formed Pro Wrestling USA in 1985 but the endeavor failed by the end of the year.

Many fans, especially those in the Deep South, were angered by the collapse of their local wrestling promotions. Some of the more well-known promotions included Championship Wrestling from Florida and Mid-Atlantic Championship Wrestling in Charlotte, North Carolina, were affected. These fans turned to Atlanta-based WCW broadcast on TBS. In most of these areas, WWF shows were not financially successful until 1997–98.

Rock 'n' Wrestling Connection 

The WWF would go on to a period of unprecedented success in the mid-to-late 1980s and early 1990s. The success was in part precipitated by the "Rock 'n' Wrestling Connection," a period of cooperation and cross-promotion between the WWF and elements of the music industry. The idea was formed by WWF manager Lou Albano, who met singer Cyndi Lauper on a trip to Puerto Rico. Lauper asked Albano to appear as her father in her video for the single "Girls Just Want to Have Fun" in 1983. 
McMahon later booked Lauper and Albano on a segment of Piper's Pit. During the segment, the Rock 'n' Wrestling storyline began when Albano called Lauper a "broad", while Lauper retaliated by hitting him with her purse. She then challenged Albano to a match between two female wrestlers of their choice.

MTV broadcast the first live wrestling match on cable television as well as the first live women's professional wrestling match. Lauper chose Wendi Richter, while Albano chose The Fabulous Moolah. The match was scheduled for July 23, 1984, at The Brawl to End it All, broadcast live on MTV. Richter defeated Moolah for the WWF Women's Championship, which the WWF had promoted as having been held by Moolah for the previous 28 years. The connection between Lauper and the WWF continued with the video for the song "The Goonies 'R' Good Enough", "Time After Time," and "She Bop," all of which featured WWF wrestlers. 

On September 14, 1985, Hulk Hogan's Rock 'n' Wrestling, an animated television series starring the character of Hulk Hogan, premiered on CBS. The series ran until June 6, 1987, in the process expanding Hogan's young fanbase.

The inaugural WrestleMania 

In 1985, to counter the AWA's Super Sunday, the NWA's Starrcade and WCCW's Star Wars, the WWF created its own flagship show, WrestleMania I, held at Madison Square Garden and broadcast on 135 closed-circuit networks. The future of not just the WWF's national experiment but the whole professional wrestling industry came down to the success or failure of this pay-per-view. WrestleMania was an extravaganza marketed as "the Super Bowl of professional wrestling". The concept of a wrestling supercard was nothing new in North America; the NWA had been running Starrcade a few years prior to WrestleMania, and even the elder McMahon had marketed large Shea Stadium cards viewable in closed circuit locations. However, Wrestlemania I drew the interest of the mainstream media by including celebrities such as Mr. T and Cyndi Lauper to participate in the event. MTV's popularity and coverage of the women's wrestling feud generated a great deal of interest in WWF programming at this time.

The show was a huge success. Hogan, who won in the main event, appeared on the cover of Sports Illustrated which, after the swimsuit issue, was the magazine's best seller of 1985. Professional wrestling began to become mainstream, thanks, in large part, to the appeal of Hulkamania among children. Large television networks took wrestling into their weekly programming, including Saturday Night's Main Event, premiering on NBC in May 1985, as well as the syndicated weekly show WWF Championship Wrestling (which was also broadcast internationally). While Championship Wrestling was generally taped in Poughkeepsie, New York, Saturday Night's Main Event was taped in front of packed arenas around the country.

WrestleMania's popularity and ratings appeal made professional wrestling a television mainstay. Professional wrestling, now synonymous with the WWF, began to throw more grandiose matches. In November 1985, a second pay-per-view "The Wrestling Classic" took place. The concept, a one-night tournament, was a huge success and would become a regular event, titled King of the Ring.

NWA competes with WWF 

Jim Crockett, also envisioning a nationwide promotion, absorbed several other NWA members into a single entity known as Jim Crockett Promotions (JCP). In 1986, he renamed JCP "NWA World Championship Wrestling". He would acquire several more promotions, including some non-NWA members, in the following year. By late 1987, Crockett's ownership of so many NWA affiliates, coupled with his continued presidency of the NWA, gave him considerable power. However, Crockett's spending had left JCP indebted, with the promotion facing a $5 million deficit. Crockett's attempt to generate revenue with the broadcast of the highly promoted Starrcade pay-per-view in late 1987 was thwarted by McMahon, who held his Survivor Series pay-per-view on the same day. The WWF threatened to cancel their contracts with cable companies that dared to carry Starrcade. As a result, only five cable companies opted to remain loyal to Crockett, which gave them only an $80,000 profit after expenses. A similar situation arose in January 1988, when Crockett's Bunkhouse Stampede pay-per-view was counter-programmed by the inaugural Royal Rumble, which aired for free on the USA Network. On November 21, 1988, Crockett was obliged to sell his promotion to Ted Turner. Under the ownership of Turner, the promotion was rechristened World Championship Wrestling (WCW). After years of financial turmoil and the constant changing of bookers, WCW would resume competition with McMahon's WWF when former AWA commentator Eric Bischoff was appointed as the promotion's Executive Vice President.

Hulk Hogan, André the Giant, Randy Savage, and Miss Elizabeth 

WWF held its most successful event, WrestleMania III, in March 1987. It achieved the largest recorded attendance for a live indoor sporting event in North America with a claimed figure of 93,173 attendees. The main event, during which Hogan scoop-slammed (later dubbed "the body slam heard around the world") and defeated André the Giant, helped the show go down in wrestling history as one of the greatest ever produced and made the WWF's popularity soar. In February 1988, Hogan and André faced each other in a special WrestleMania III rematch on the Friday night prime time spin-off of Saturday Night's Main Event, titled The Main Event I which saw Hogan lose to André by manipulation of the "Million Dollar Man" Ted DiBiase. After the match, André handed the title to DiBiase as promised, resulting in the title being vacated and setting the stage for a WWF World Heavyweight Championship tournament at WrestleMania IV. On a previous edition of the same show, "Macho Man" Randy Savage made his official transition from heel to babyface in his match against The Honky Tonk Man, with Miss Elizabeth bringing in Hogan to aid Savage against The Honky Tonk Man and The Hart Foundation. This eventually struck a friendship between Savage and Hogan.

At WrestleMania IV, Savage won the WWF World Heavyweight Championship tournament, with Miss Elizabeth and Hogan at his side. Months later, Hogan and Savage teamed up as The Mega Powers; and at the first ever SummerSlam, they faced off against DiBiase and André's tag team known as The Mega Bucks. Though friends and tag partners, over the period of a year tensions began to build for various reasons, finally resulting in Savage striking Hogan in early 1989, turning Savage heel once again, and setting up a WWF World Heavyweight Championship match at WrestleMania V, which saw Hogan after over a year once again hold the title. Savage and Hogan continued to feud until the February 1990 edition of The Main Event III, where Hogan successfully defended the title in a special WrestleMania V rematch.

End of an era 

Generally, WrestleMania VI on April 1, 1990, is acknowledged as the end of the 1980s wrestling boom. The event saw one of the last WWF appearances of André the Giant (as a member of the Colossal Connection), who had become barely mobile in the ring due to real life health issues, and his parting with long-time manager Bobby "The Brain" Heenan. In addition, Nikolai Volkoff (then part of The Bolsheviks) played his standard part as the evil Soviet Russian for one last time before turning babyface and embracing America, reflecting the end of the Cold War. The main event was a title-for-title match between WWF World Heavyweight Champion Hulk Hogan and Intercontinental Heavyweight Champion The Ultimate Warrior. It not only pitted the WWF's two biggest faces against each other, but was intended as the "passing of the torch" from Hogan, the star of the 1980s, to Warrior, who was immensely popular and considered to be Hogan's successor. Hogan's clean pin fall loss signaled the end of an era. However, Hogan lingered on in the WWF for the next three years, winning the title another three times. By the early 1990s, Hogan started appearing with much less frequency on WWF events, with Warrior taking the main-event spot through all of 1990 and 1991.

Fans who were kids in the mid-late 1980s were teens by the 1990s, and many grew bored with the comic book style of wrestling of the 1980s, turning their attention away from their childhood favorites such as Hogan, Junkyard Dog, and "Superfly" Jimmy Snuka, in favor of newer and grittier wrestlers like The Undertaker, Shawn Michaels, Razor Ramon, Diesel, and Bret "Hitman" Hart in the New Generation Era; then in the Attitude Era in favor of Stone Cold Steve Austin, The Rock, Triple H, Mick Foley (whether competing as Cactus Jack, Dude Love, or Mankind), and The New Age Outlaws. Miss Elizabeth left the WWF in April 1992, and divorced Randy Savage that August. Hogan's return to the WWF in February 1993, episode of Monday Night Raw (which replaced another WWF program during the 1980s, Prime Time Wrestling) received a lackluster reaction from the crowds. Hulk Hogan left the WWF during the summer of 1993, and joined WCW the following spring, while Randy Savage left the WWF for WCW in November 1994.

See also 

 History of professional wrestling
 Monday Night Wars

Footnotes

References 
 
 

1980s in American television
Economic history of the United States
History of WWE
World Championship Wrestling
National Wrestling Alliance
Jim Crockett Promotions
American Wrestling Association
World Class Championship Wrestling
Universal Wrestling Federation (Bill Watts)
Continental Wrestling Association
Southwest Championship Wrestling
History of professional wrestling